Vivek Ganapathy Ramaswamy (born August 9, 1985) is an American entrepreneur, author, and conservative political activist. The author of Woke, Inc. (2021) and Nation of Victims (2022), he was labeled "one of the intellectual godfathers of the anti-woke movement" by Politico.

After working as an investment partner, Ramaswamy founded the biopharmaceutical company Roivant Sciences in 2014. Since 2020, he has written and spoken out against stakeholder capitalism, big tech censorship, and critical race theory. After leaving Roivant in 2021, Ramaswamy co-founded Strive Asset Management and serves as its executive chairman, an investment firm opposed to the environmental, social, and corporate governance (ESG) framework. On February 21, 2023, he announced his candidacy in the 2024 Republican Party presidential primaries on Tucker Carlson Tonight.

Early life and education
Ramaswamy was born in 1985 in Cincinnati, Ohio, and raised there. His parents emigrated from Vadakkencherry, Palakkad, Kerala, India. His father graduated from a regional engineering college in Kerala and worked for General Electric as an engineer and patent attorney, while his mother graduated from Mysore Medical College and worked as a geriatric psychiatrist. Ramaswamy has argued that American-style capitalism provides an antidote to India's caste system by offering lower-caste citizens more economic opportunities.

Ramaswamy graduated in 2003 from St. Xavier High School, a Jesuit high school in Cincinnati. He was his class valedictorian and a nationally ranked junior tennis player.

In 2007, Ramaswamy graduated from Harvard College summa cum laude and Phi Beta Kappa with an A.B. in biology. He wrote his senior thesis on the ethical questions raised by creating human-animal chimeras. His thesis was awarded the Bowdoin Prize for Natural Sciences, and a precis was published in The New York Times and The Boston Globe in 2007. In 2011, Ramaswamy was awarded a post-graduate fellowship by the The Paul & Daisy Soros Fellowships for New Americans. In 2013, he received a J.D. from Yale Law School.

Business career
In 2007, Ramaswamy and Travis May co-founded Campus Venture Network, a technology company that provided software and networking resources to university entrepreneurs. The company was acquired in 2009 by the Ewing Marion Kauffman Foundation. From 2007 to 2014, Ramaswamy worked at QVT Financial, where he was a partner and co-managed the firm's biotech portfolio while simultaneously attending Yale Law School from 2010 to 2013.

Roivant Sciences 
In 2014, Ramaswamy founded the pharmaceutical company Roivant Sciences, which focuses on applying technology to drug development, serving as CEO until 2021. He appeared on the cover of Forbes magazine in 2015 for his work in drug development. The story was about Ramaswamy raising $360 million for the Roivant subsidiary Axovant Sciences in an attempt to save an Alzheimer's drug that had failed at GlaxoSmith Kline.

In 2020, Ramaswamy co-founded Chapter Medicare, a Medicare navigation platform.

In early 2021, Ramaswamy stepped down as CEO of Roivant Sciences.

Strive Asset Management 
Ramaswamy is the co-founder and executive chairman of Strive Asset Management, an Ohio-based asset management firm that was backed financially by Peter Thiel and J. D. Vance, among others. Strive was established to offer an alternative to larger asset managers like BlackRock, State Street and Vanguard, which Ramaswamy has criticized for engaging in environmental, social, and governance (ESG) activities, and mixing business with politics to the alleged detriment of shareholders.

Strive's total assets under management surpassed $500 million on November 11, 2022, three months after its first fund launched. In January 2023, Strive launched a proxy advisory service to compete with such mainstream firms as Glass Lewis and Institutional Shareholder Services. Axios and Bloomberg have called Ramaswamy "the leading anti-ESG crusader."

Political involvement 
Ramaswamy has proposed repealing a law that forces presidents to spend all the money Congress appropriates. He rejects the diversity, equity, and inclusion and environmental, social, and governance (ESG) movements.

In 2022, Ramaswamy considered a candidacy in the 2022 United States Senate election in Ohio. On February 21, 2023, he declared his candidacy for president of the United States in the 2024 election. According to a profile in Politico, Ramaswamy was inspired by Donald Trump's victory in the 2016 presidential election, and wants to run "with an entrepreneurial spirit, unorthodox ideas, and few expectations" in the hopes of building "a major following that will carry him to the presidency.”

2024 United States presidential election 

Ramaswamy announced his candidacy on the Fox News show Tucker Carlson Tonight on February 21, 2023.

Published works 
 
Woke, Inc. debuted at No. 2 in the 'Hardcover Nonfiction' section of the New York Times Best Sellers list on September 5, 2021. Ramaswamy calls environmental, social, and corporate governance investing the most serious threat to American democracy. 

Reviewers cited Ramaswamy's "spot-on analyses of corrosive corporate duplicity" while also criticizing his conclusions, saying they "arrive filtered through a Fox News funhouse mirror". They further said that he made "important points about the misguided nature of ESG investing [and] the folly of attempting to inject politics into business," while highlighting that Ramaswamy's discussion of what he considers woke-motivated firings fails to "make a case that these are representative of widespread employment trends". Russell Greene, writing on Real Clear Markets, applauded the book's timeliness and wrote, "the problems Ramaswamy describes are real and likely to get worse", while also arguing that Ramaswamy did "not permit his ample experience to inform his theory", leading him to present "a vision for business that overlooks how corporations, and corporate law, actually work." Joe Berkowitz, in Fast Company, observed that Ramaswamy "often seems more concerned with so-called wokeness itself than with woke corporations." The book significantly raised Ramaswamy's profile, leading to frequent talk show appearances, especially on Fox News.

 

In Nation of Victims, Ramaswamy critiques what he sees as the victimhood culture at the heart of America's decline. Using examples from history and incorporating themes from Western philosophy and Eastern theology, he suggests that the disappearance of excellence and exceptionalism, which he identifies as at the heart of American identity, has left a deep moral and cultural vacuum in the nation. In his review for The Wall Street Journal, Tunku Varadarajan wrote that Nation of Victims makes a "passionate, persuasive case" for "closing off victimhood as a path to success." Comparing it to the work of Shelby Steele and John McWhorter’s Woke Racism, Varadarajan wrote:

Nation of Victims—always vigorous, in places uncompromising—offers a surprisingly wistful, even docile, solution to America’s problem of victimhood. We’re locked in a "grievance-fueled race to the bottom," where the very language we use—including basic words like "woman" and "equality"—have [sic] paralyzed dialogue across partisan lines. How do we emerge from this civic hell of mutual incomprehension? Mr. Ramaswamy's answer is that we must "find a way to forgive each other instead of trying to win at the game of playing the victim." That sounds like a very fine idea.

Personal life 
Ramaswamy met his wife, Apoorva, an assistant professor and clinician at the Ohio State University Wexner Medical Center, when they lived near each other at Yale University, where they were studying law and medicine, respectively. They have two sons. Ramaswamy is Hindu. 

In 2016, Forbes estimated Ramaswamy's net worth at $600 million, and listed his residence as New York City.

References

External links

 

1985 births
Living people
Businesspeople from Cincinnati
Harvard University alumni
Yale Law School alumni
American company founders
Chief executives in the pharmaceutical industry
St. Xavier High School (Ohio) alumni
21st-century American businesspeople
American people of Malayali descent
American male writers of Indian descent
Asian conservatism in the United States
American Hindus
New York (state) Republicans
Candidates in the 2024 United States presidential election